Electronics City, Kochi, also known as NeST Electronic City is an under construction Special Economic Zone targeting electronics hardware manufacturing, promoted by NeST group located at Kochi, India.

It also accommodates a non processing area of  occupied by a shopping mall with multiplex and an international convention centre, as well as residential apartments and condominiums.

Location and connectivity 

The township is located 17 km from the city centre and 22 km from the International Airport, among an area where a number of other similar developments are being planned. The distance to NH 47 is 5 km.

The VSNL’s communication gateway is located less than 7 km from the park. This gateway handles around 70% of the country’s data traffic. Two submarine cables, namely SAFE and SEA-ME-WE 3 have their landing points at the gateway. Kochi offers Pacific and Atlantic route of connectivity to the US.

Infrastructure 

70% of the built up area of the township will be used for IT and ITES industries. The remaining 30% will be non processing area, used for residential, commercial and entertainment purposes.

See also 
 Economy of Kochi
 Infopark, Kochi
 Smart City

References

External links
 Keralait.org

Science parks in India
Economy of Kochi